Hogan-Borger Mound Archeological District is a registered historic site near Ross, Ohio, listed in the National Register on 1975-10-21.

Historic uses 
Ceremonial Site
Graves/Burials

See also
Mound
Mound builder (people)
Earthwork (archaeology)

Notes 

Archaeological sites in Ohio
Archaeological sites on the National Register of Historic Places in Ohio
National Register of Historic Places in Butler County, Ohio
Mounds in Ohio